Boughton Fen is a  biological Site of Special Scientific Interest east of Downham Market in Norfolk. it is common land registered to Boughton Parish Council.

This valley in a tributary of the River Wissey is covered by tall fen over most of the site, together with areas of scrub which provide a habitat for breeding birds. There are many uncommon species of moths, including the rare Perizoma sagittaria.

There is access to the site from Oxborough Road.

References

Sites of Special Scientific Interest in Norfolk